Kim Bo-kyung (born October 16, 1987), better known as Stephanie Kim or Stephanie, is a Korean-American singer, ballerina and musical actress based in South Korea. Born and raised in California, she went to South Korea and joined SM Entertainment after winning Youth Best Selection Competition in February 2004. After years of training, she debuted as a member of South Korean girl group The Grace in April 2005. In October 2012, she began her solo career with the release of single album The New Beginning.

Career

2005-2010: The Grace (band) and solo career
Stephanie made her debut as a member of the girl group The Grace in 2005. Since then, they released three studio albums and ten singles. In 2010, the group W made a hiatus due to her health issues.

As of 2011, Stephanie became a member of the Los Angeles Ballet.

On October 8, 2012, Stephanie debuted as a solo artist under another music label called Media Line and released her first solo single album The New Beginning along with the title track "Game". In April 2014, it was reported that she would release an independent track in the summer under new label Mafia Records, but it was delayed due to a unknown reason. Her digital single "Prisoner" finally released in August 2015. Her follow-up digital single "Blackout" was released in late September 2015. Stephanie released her first EP "Top Secret" with title track "Up, Up" featuring Teen Top's L.joe in October 2015.

2016—present: Continued solo debut
Stephanie released her third digital single "Tomorrow" on May 6, 2016. In the end of May 2016, Stephanie's contract with SM Entertainment expired. She maintained solo act under the record label Mafia Records.

In April 2019, Stephanie joined WK Media after her contract with Mafia Records ended. Soon afterwards, Stephanie released the digital single "Man on the Dance Floor" on April 18.

Discography

Extended plays

Singles

Collaborations

Original Soundtracks

Filmography

Dramas

Variety show

Musical theatre

Radio show

References

External links

 

1987 births
Living people
American musicians of Korean descent
American K-pop singers
Korean-language singers of the United States
South Korean female idols
American women pop singers
American contemporary R&B singers
American musical theatre actresses
American radio DJs
American dance musicians
American television personalities
American women television personalities
American television actresses
SM Entertainment artists
21st-century American singers
21st-century American women singers
American women radio presenters
South Korean women radio presenters
South Korean mezzo-sopranos
Rancho Bernardo High School alumni